Sidy Mohamed Sanokho (born 8 May 1997) is a French professional footballer who plays as a midfielder.

Playing career
Sanokho spent his youth career with French clubs Gentilly AC, COSM Arcueil, Montrouge FC 92, UJA Maccabi Paris Métropole, and then Italian sides Spezia Calcio and Novara Calcio. He then returned to France to pay senior football with Racing Club de France and AS Furiani-Agliani. He travelled to England and signed a short-term contract with EFL League Two side Swindon Town in August 2019 after impressing manager Richie Wellens on a trial basis. He made his first-team debut for the "Robins" on 13 November, in a 1–0 defeat at Bristol Rovers in the EFL Trophy.

Statistics

References

1997 births
Living people
French footballers
Black French sportspeople
Association football midfielders
UJA Maccabi Paris Métropole players
Racing Club de France Football players
AS Furiani-Agliani players
French expatriate footballers
Expatriate footballers in Italy
Spezia Calcio players
Novara F.C. players
Expatriate footballers in England
Swindon Town F.C. players
English Football League players